Ruben Carlos Gamarra Cáceres (17 February 1948 – 16 December 2005), was a Paraguayan chess FIDE Master (FM), four-times Paraguayan Chess Championship winner (1971, 1975, 1979, 1993).

Biography
From the begin of 1970s to the mid-1990s Carlos Gamarra Cáceres was one of Paraguay's leading chess players. He four times won Paraguayan Chess Championships: 1971, 1975, 1979, and 1993. Carlos Gamarra Cáceres five times participated in World Chess Championship South American Zonal tournaments: 1972, 1975, 1985, 1989, and 2003. Also he participated in Pan American Chess Championship in 1977.

Carlos Gamarra Cáceres played for Paraguay in the Chess Olympiads:
 In 1976, at second board in the 22nd Chess Olympiad in Haifa (+5, =2, -5),
 In 1978, at second board in the 23rd Chess Olympiad in Buenos Aires (+2, =3, -5),
 In 1980, at first board in the 24th Chess Olympiad in La Valletta (+5, =2, -7),
 In 1982, at second board in the 25th Chess Olympiad in Lucerne (+2, =4, -6),
 In 1984, at third board in the 26th Chess Olympiad in Thessaloniki (+3, =3, -6),
 In 1986, at second reserve board in the 27th Chess Olympiad in Dubai (+3, =2, -3),
 In 1988, at fourth board in the 28th Chess Olympiad in Thessaloniki (+5, =2, -4).

Carlos Gamarra Cáceres played for Paraguay in the Pan American Team Chess Championships:
 In 1985, at fourth board in the 2nd Panamerican Team Chess Championship in Villa Gesell (+0, =0, -3),
 In 1987, at third board in the 3rd Panamerican Team Chess Championship in Junín (+0, =6, -3),
 In 1991, at third board in the 4th Panamerican Team Chess Championship in Guarapuava (+1, =1, -4).

In 2010, the Carlos Gamarra Cáceres memorial was held in Asunción.

References

External links

Carlos Gamarra Cáceres chess games at 365chess.com

1948 births
2005 deaths
Paraguayan chess players
Chess FIDE Masters
Chess Olympiad competitors
20th-century chess players
20th-century Paraguayan people